A special election was held in  on August 4, 1795 to fill a vacancy left by the death of Alexander Mebane (DR) on July 5, 1795, before the start of the 1st session of the 4th Congress.

Election results
Complete results are not available, the below results are based on incomplete returns

Tatom took his seat at the start of the 4th Congress, on December 7, 1795.  Tatom subsequently resigned at the end of the 1st session, on June 1, 1796 necessitating a second special election in the same district.

See also
List of special elections to the United States House of Representatives
 United States House of Representatives elections, 1794 and 1795

References

North Carolina 1795 04
North Carolina 1795 04
1795 04
North Carolina 04
United States House of Representatives 04
United States House of Representatives 1795 04